The Sister Sister Sister Tour is the second headlining concert tour by American band Haim, in support of their sophomore album, Something to Tell You (2017). The tour began on April 3, 2018 in Portland, Oregon at the Arlene Schnitzer Concert Hall. They continued throughout North America and finally concluded their 37-date tour on June 21, 2018 in Oslo, Norway at the Sentrum Scene. Opening acts for the tour included rapper Lizzo, who was present for most North American dates, as well as performers Grace Carter in Europe and Maggie Rogers on both continents.

Set list
This set list is representative of the performance on June 16, 2018. It is not representative of all concerts for the duration of the tour.
"Falling"
"Don't Save Me"
"Little of Your Love"
"My Song 5"
"Ready For You"
"You Never Knew"
"Want You Back"
"Walking Away"
"Something To Tell You"
"Nothing's Wrong"
"Forever"
"The Wire"
"Night So Long"
"Found It In Silence"
"Right Now"

Notes 

 During their June 13, 2018 and June 18, 2018 shows, Alana and Este led the sets as a result of Danielle losing her voice.
 During their April 4, 2018, May 12, 2018, and May 28, 2018 shows, Este and Lizzo covered "The Boy Is Mine" (as "The Girl is Mine") by Brandy and Monica.

Tour dates

Notes

References

2018 concert tours